Events from the year 1558 in India.

Events
 Ibrahim Adil Shah I reign (since 1534) as king of the Bijapur Sultanate ends with his death
 Ali Adil Shah I reign as 5th Bijapur Sultanate begins (until 1580)
 The Mughal-Rajput War begins (and continues until 1578)

Births

Deaths
 August 23 Joao De Bustamante, pioneer of the art of printing in India, specifically in Goa dies (born 1536).
 Ibrahim Adil Shah I, king of the Bijapur Sultanate

See also

 Timeline of Indian history

References

 
India